Alalkomenes (before 1928: Μαμούρα Mamoura) is a village and a community in the municipality of Livadeia, Boeotia, central Greece. It is situated in a wide plain, 6 km northeast of Koroneia, 10 km east of Livadeia and 30 km west of Thebes. The community Alalkomenes consists of the villages Alalkomenes and Agios Athanasios. The population of the community was 178 in 2011.

Population

History

In 1928 the village Mamoura was renamed Alalkomenes after the nearby ancient town of Alalcomenae, that existed in the vicinity. The village became a separate community (together with Agios Athanasios) in 1928, when it was split from the community of Vrastamites. In 1997 it became part of the municipality of Koroneia, which merged into the municipality of Livadeia in 2010.

Transport
The village is served by Alalkomenes railway station, with local stopping services to Leianokladi and Athens.

References 

Populated places in Boeotia